Gentian Stojku (born 22 July 1974) is an Albanian former football midfielder and football coach who most recently was the head coach of Burreli in the Albanian First Division.

Playing career

Club
He started his career at KF Elbasani, and then played at Shkumbini, Elbasani for a second time, Erzgebirge Aue, Elbasani for a third time, Teuta, SC Pfullendorf, Elbasani for a fourth time, Egnatia, Shkumbini for a second time, Elbasani for a fifth time, Vllaznia and Elbasani for a sixth time.

International
He made his debut for Albania in a May 1994 friendly match away against Macedonia, in which he was substituted before half time by Edi Martini. It proved to be his sole international game.

Managerial career
After retiring as a player, Stojku became coach of former club Gramshi and later managed Sopoti and Pogradeci.

In November 2016 he was named manager of Tomori and 
Stojku was succeeded by Gentian Begeja as coach of Erzeni in February 2019, when Stojku joined Kamza. He left Apolonia Fier in June 2019 after keeping them in the Albanian First Division and he was dismissed by Burreli in October 2019.

References

External links

 German league stats - FuPa

1974 births
Living people
People from Elbasan
Association football midfielders
Albanian footballers
Albania international footballers
KF Elbasani players
KS Shkumbini Peqin players
FC Erzgebirge Aue players
KF Teuta Durrës players
SC Pfullendorf players
KS Egnatia Rrogozhinë players
KF Vllaznia Shkodër players
KF Gramshi players
KF Bylis Ballsh players
Albanian football managers
FK Tomori Berat managers
FC Kamza managers
KF Apolonia Fier managers
KS Burreli managers
Kategoria Superiore players
Kategoria e Parë players
Kategoria Superiore managers